Viridus is a Massachusetts-based online professional network startup. It was founded in 2007 in Arlington, Massachusetts by Furqan Nazeeri, Entrepreneur-in-Residence at Softbank Capital and Michael DiPietro, a former VP at an environmental, health and safety software company.

In April 2008, the company announced the beginning of a private beta.

Viridus is an irregular form of the Latin 'viridis' meaning "green" and from that 'young, energetic'.  It is pronounced veer-id-us.

Services
Viridus is a private, members-only network of business professionals who have responsibility for the sustainability of their organization.  Services offered by Viridus include:

 Forums
 Company and member directory
 Document exchange
 Event calendar
 Green business news aggregation

Corporate and Environmental Sustainability
Bottom line corporate issues, such as water abatement and energy savings, are now intertwined with the world's most pressing environmental concerns, and corporations are increasingly recognizing the urgency of demonstrably and dramatically reducing their negative impact on the climate.

Corporate citizens now require access to a knowledge base of timely, relevant and practical information, tips and resources that help them solve their corporate and environmental sustainability issues.

Viridus believes that dialog and active collaboration amongst corporate citizens and stakeholders will be key to developing the necessary tools and knowledge base that help corporations solve their daily sustainability issues.

Viridus provides an online platform, together with tips and tools, for every corporate citizen to connect and collaborate in developing pathways towards a sustainable future.

The Viridus tagline is "everyone has a green collar job", meaning that everyone has an opportunity (and responsibility) to be environmentally responsible at work.

External links
 Viridus Website

References

Viridus